Glen Oaks is a neighborhood in the North District of Baltimore. Its boundaries form a slender, inverted triangle, with the city line as the neighborhood's northern base and Belvedere Shopping Center as its southern apex. Chinquapin Parkway (west) and The Alameda (east) draw the triangle's sides and cross at the neighborhood's southern tip.

Most of the homes in Glen Oaks are brick row houses, built in 1948 by Elba Construction, Inc.

The neighborhoods of Chinquapin Park-Belevedere, Lake Walker and Cameron Village are located to the west of Glen Oaks, on the opposite side Chinquapin Park. Idlewood, Ramblewood and Woodbourne Heights are located to the east, across The Alameda in the Northeast District.

Route 36 (MTA Maryland) provides bus service along The Alameda, connecting Glen Oaks residents with Downtown Baltimore. Route 44 (MTA Maryland) provides cross-town service along Belvedere Avenue.

Median household income for Glen Oaks in 2009 was estimated at $44,821, while the citywide median was only $38,772. Residents living below the poverty level were 12.5 percent of the Glen Oaks population and 22.9 percent of the Baltimore population. About 3/4 of the Glen Oaks population of 3,012 (census estimate for 2009) were black and almost 1/4 were white.

See also
List of Baltimore neighborhoods

References

External links 
 North District Maps, Baltimore City Neighborhoods Portal

Neighborhoods in Baltimore
Northern Baltimore